Soňa Nováková-Dosoudilová (born 6 October 1975 in Olomouc) is a female beach volleyball player from the Czech Republic. She twice represented her native country at the Summer Olympics: 2000 and 2004. Partnering Eva Celbová she claimed the gold medal at the 1998 European Championships.

Playing partners
 Eva Celbová
 Petra Novotná
 Lucie Růžková
 Tereza Tobiášová
 Monika Kučerová
 Martina Šmídová

References

External links
 
 

1975 births
Living people
Czech beach volleyball players
Beach volleyball players at the 2000 Summer Olympics
Beach volleyball players at the 2004 Summer Olympics
Sportspeople from Olomouc
Olympic beach volleyball players of the Czech Republic

Women's beach volleyball players